Judith Pietersen (born 3 July 1989 in Eibergen) is a Dutch volleyball player, who plays as an opposite. She is a member of the Women's National Team, and competed in the 2016 Summer Olympics. She plays for Volley Millenium Brescia.

She learned playing volleyball in the garden from her cousin Caroline Wensink, who was later a teammate in the Dutch national team.

Clubs
  Longa '59 Lichtenvoorde (2005–2008)
  Martinus Amstelveen (2008–2009)
  TVC Amstelveen (2009–2011)
  Dresdner SC (2011–2013)
  Atom Trefl Sopot (2013–2014)
  Trabzon İdmanocağı (2014–2015)
  Pallavolo Scandicci (2015–2016)
  AGIL Volley (2016-2017)
  River Volley (2017-2018)
  Volley Millenium Brescia (2018-2019)

Awards

Clubs

National championships
 2016/2017  Italian Championship, with Igor Gorgonzola Novara

References

External links
 FIVB Profile

1989 births
Living people
Dutch women's volleyball players
Dutch expatriate sportspeople in Italy
Dutch expatriate sportspeople in Germany
People from Berkelland
Expatriate volleyball players in Germany
Expatriate volleyball players in Turkey
European Games competitors for the Netherlands
Volleyball players at the 2015 European Games
Volleyball players at the 2016 Summer Olympics
Expatriate volleyball players in Italy
Expatriate volleyball players in Poland
Expatriate volleyball players in Brazil
Dutch expatriate sportspeople in Turkey
Dutch expatriate sportspeople in Poland
Dutch expatriate sportspeople in Brazil
Olympic volleyball players of the Netherlands
Sportspeople from Gelderland